The 2006–07 Slovak 1.Liga season was the 14th season of the Slovak 1. Liga, the second level of ice hockey in Slovakia. 16 teams participated in the league, and MHK Kezmarok won the championship.

Regular season

Pre-Playoffs 
 HK 95 Považská Bystrica – HK Lokomotíva Nové Zámky 3:0 (3:0, 3:2, 5:4 n.P.)
 HC VTJ Topoľčany – HKM Humenné 3:2 (6:3, 4:1, 3:4 n.P., 3:8, 8:3)
 ŠHK 37 Piešťany – HK Trnava 3:0 (5:4, 5:1, 4:3)
 HC Dukla Senica – HK Ružinov 99 Bratislava 1:3 (3:4 n.V., 3:1, 5:6, 2:3)

Playoffs

Quarterfinals

 HK Spišská Nová Ves – HK Ružinov 99 Bratislava  4:0  (8:1, 5:2, 7:2, 5:3)
 MHK SkiPark Kežmarok – ŠHK 37 Piešťany  4:0  (4:0, 3:2, 4:1, 1:0)
 HK Lietajúce Kone Prešov – HC VTJ Topoľčany  1:4  (9:3, 0:2, 3:4, 1:2PP, 3:4sn)
 HC ’05 Banská Bystrica – HK 95 Považská Bystrica  4:0  (8:0, 4:0, 4:3, 7:1)

Semifinals 

 HK Spišská Nová Ves – HC VTJ Topoľčany  4:1  (3:4PP, 4:1, 5:1, 10:3, 3:0)
 MHK SkiPark Kežmarok – HC ’05 Banská Bystrica  4:0  (5:2, 6:2, 6:2, 3:2PP)

Final 

 HK Spišská Nová Ves – MHK SkiPark Kežmarok  2:4  (1:5, 2:1, 2:6, 2:1, 0:4, 2:3)

External links
 Season on hockeyarchives.info

Slovak 1. Liga
Slovak 1. Liga seasons
Liga